Steve Grantley (born 8 March 1962) is an English rock drummer who plays for Stiff Little Fingers, and formerly the Alarm and RTZ Global. Between 1982 and 1987, he played drums for Jake Burns and the Big Wheel. He has also worked with Alicia Keys, Julian Lennon and the band Eighth Wonder and auditioned for the Clash after the departure of Terry Chimes.

He has written two books with Alan Parker, one about the 1970s rock band Slade and another about the Who called Who by Numbers.

Bibliography
The Who by Numbers, Steve Grantley, Alan Parker, Helter Skelter Publishing, 24 June 2010, 
Cum On, Feel the Noize : The Story of Slade, Steve Grantley, Alan Parker, Carlton Books, 4 September 2006,

References

Living people
English rock drummers
New wave drummers
English male writers
Stiff Little Fingers members
The Alarm members
1962 births